Pakruojis is a city in Lithuania. It is situated on the Kruoja River, which has a dam above the city. Forty three buildings of the manor, mentioned in 1531 still survive.

History
Pakruojis and it neighbourhood are within the boundaries of the inhabited area of the Semigallian tribe. For a long time it was thought that the town was founded in 1585, when the town and Pakruojis manor were mentioned in land ownership records. This date has entered several encyclopedias. However, historian Algimantas Miškinis discovered that Pakruojis was first mentioned in 1531. On July 10, 1613 the first church of Pakruojis had inaugural service in it new building. Sigismund III Vasa granted  rights for two annual fairs.

Landowners von Ropa, who owned Pakruojis Manor from the beginning of 19th century, had a great influence on the development of the city.

In 1801 the oldest wooden synagogue of Pakruojis in Lithuania was built.

In July and August, 1941, German soldiers with the help of local white armbanders massacred a total of 400 Jews from Pakruojis district in the nearby Morkakalnis forest.

Pakruojis wooden synagogue survived World War II.  It is the largest and the oldest of the wooden synagogues that survives in Lithuania, but had been in deteriorating condition for a long time. On May 3, 2009 the synagogue suffered severe damage in a possible arson fire,; it underwent restoration 2014–2016 and was reopened in May 2017.

In 1950 Pakruojis was granted city rights.

In 1982 a railway from Radviliškis was upgraded and narrow railway replaced with wide railway.

In 1993 the coat of arms of Pakruojis was approved.

International relations

Twin towns — sister cities
Pakruojis is twinned with:
 Mariestad, Sweden
 Bauska, Latvia

People 
 Eugen von Keyserling (1833-1889), German-Baltic arachnologist
 Vilma Bardauskienė (born 1953), long jumper

References

External links

 Pakruojis manor

 
Cities in Šiauliai County
Cities in Lithuania
Municipalities administrative centres of Lithuania
Ponevezhsky Uyezd
Holocaust locations in Lithuania
Pakruojis District Municipality